Panagiotis Kordonouris (born 8 November 1975) is a Greek former footballer. He spent the majority of his career in Crete, representing clubs at various competition levels spanning the Greek Superleague to Crete's amateur regional competitions.

Playing career
Born in Amaliada, Kordonouris began playing football with his local side Asteras Amaliada, before being spotted by Alpha Ethniki club Panachaiki in 1996. He played for Panachaiki for five seasons, between 1996 and 2001, registering over 150 appearances across all competitions. He then moved to fellow Alpha Ethniki side Skoda Xanthi, where he stayed for four years but made only 36 league appearances. He moved on loan to Beta Ethniki side Ergotelis in July 2005, and helped his club earn promotion to the Superleague as champions. Ergotelis renewed his contract for the 2006−07 season, after Kordonouris was released by Xanthi. He stayed with the Cretans until 2010, when he was offered a post in the managerial team at age 35 which Kordonouris refused. He returned to his former club Panachaiki for six months and eventually signed with Football League side Levadiakos for the rest of the season.

Kordonouris returned to Crete after his brief stint at Levadiakos, having celebrated another promotion. He signed with Gamma Ethniki side AO Chania and left the club after six months to join fellow Cretan third-tier competitors Rouvas until the end of the season. He then signed his final professional contract with P.A.O. Krousonas, also in the Gamma Ethniki, before dropping down to play in the amateur regional competitions of the Heraklion Football Clubs Association.

Career statistics

Managerial career
Kordonouris holds the UEFA C Licence. He began his managerial career as a coach at the Ergotelis Youth Academy while he still played for Heraklion FCA A1 Division club Tylissos, and was promoted to head coach of the Martinengo Heraklion FCA C Division Ergotelis football department in 2018. He was promoted to the head coach position for the unofficial U−17 youth team of the club, Kanaria Ergoteli in 2019.

Honours
Ergotelis
Beta Ethniki: 1
 2006

References

External links
Profile at epae.org
Guardian Football
Profile at Onsports.gr

1975 births
Living people
Greek footballers
Panachaiki F.C. players
Xanthi F.C. players
Ergotelis F.C. players
Levadiakos F.C. players
Association football defenders
People from Amaliada
Footballers from Western Greece